Trimension is a framerate enhancement software by Philips for video, primarily DVD.  The software utilizes both picture and stream information to render new frames between the original frames of video (tweening), thus increasing the framerate and enhancing the smoothness of motion.

Currently, Trimension is capable of enhancing frame rate from 24 to 48 (for 60 Hz displays) or 72 frames per second.

The motion interpolation produced by Trimension is not entirely natural, but can be pleasing in many respects.  The software has been criticized for artificial look and has been said to make film seem like video, and potentially to degrade the movie-watching experience. There is also a slight cropping of the video to allow for good edges of the smoothed picture.

Framerate enhancement can provide an interesting benefit if it is performed after upscaling.  If the picture is scaled to a high-definition resolution and then tweened, the tweened frames will have motion that exists in the high-definition space even though the actual picture resolution does not.  It is unclear whether available implementations of Trimension scale before or after tweening.

InterVideo includes Trimension as part of their WinDVD software beginning with version 6.

External links
 Philips page

Film and video technology
Multimedia software
Philips